Ferenc Markó (3 June 1832, Kismarton – 3 August 1874, Budapest) was a Hungarian painter who specialized in landscapes; usually with figures. His father was the painter, Károly Markó the Elder. His brothers, Károly Markó the Younger (Carlo) and András Markó (Andrea), were also painters.

Life and work
His initial training in art came from his father. He then joined his brothers in Italy and spent two years at the Accademia di Belle Arti di Firenze, where he made paintings of figures and nude drawings. He also became involved in the First Italian War of Independence and was imprisoned. After his release, he was banished from Italy and moved to Pest in 1853. 

He was a frequent exhibitor at the Pesti Műegylet (Pest Art Association) and the Kunstverein in Vienna. A large selection of his works may been seen at the Hungarian National Gallery. They are often confused with those of his father.

References

External links

 More works by Markó @ ArtNet

1832 births
1874 deaths
Hungarian painters
Landscape painters
People from Eisenstadt